Chemeketa Community College is a public community college in Salem, Oregon, with a campus in McMinnville, and education centers in Dallas, Brooks, and Woodburn. 
In addition, the college has a Center for Business and Industry in downtown Salem that houses the Small Business Development Center. It operates classes and programs benefiting area businesses. 

History
Chemeketa's history can be traced to 1952, when the Salem School District started the Salem Technical-Vocational School to provide training for the unemployed. It offered two programs, Nursing and Electronics, which took place in the school at the corner of 3rd and Gerth St. NW. In 1957, student records were lost in a fire at the district office.  

In 1969 the college district was formed, and a competition was held to name the new college. The winning entry came from student Susan Blum, whose submission said that the term "Chemeketa" means "a peaceful gathering place" in the language of the regional Kalapuya tribe. In December 1969, the Board of Education approved the name Chemeketa Community College. Property was purchased near Lancaster Street, and current Building 22 was constructed as the first official building.

Academics

In the early 21st century, Chemeketa offers Associate of Applied Science degrees and certificates in more than 90 professional-technical programs, as well as Associate of Arts Oregon Transfer Degrees, Associate of Applied Science, Associate of Science, Associate of Science-Oregon Transfer Business, Associate of Science-Oregon Transfer Computer Science, and an Associate of General Studies degrees.

The Northwest Wine Studies Center in Eolanear Roseburg includes a working vineyard. This is the site of the college's winemaking and vineyard management programs. This program was the first of its kind in Oregon and was developed because of the growth of the Willamette Valley as the center of wine industry.

Notable alumni
Rick Adelman, coached basketball (1977-1983) at Chemeketa Community College
Ryan Bailey, American track and field sprinter
Austin M. Bibens-Dirkx, pitcher for Major League Baseball team, Texas Rangers
Grayson Boucher, nicknamed "The Professor", professional streetball basketball player
Shane McCrae, American poet
Andy Olson, politician, former member of Oregon House of Representatives
Rashaad Powell, professional basketball player and coach

Zac Rosscup, Major League Baseball player
Ryan Thompson, American professional baseball pitcher for the Tampa Bay Rays of Major League Baseball

See also 
 List of colleges and universities in Oregon

References

External links
Chemeketa Community College (official website)

Education in Salem, Oregon
Community colleges in Oregon
Educational institutions established in 1969
Universities and colleges accredited by the Northwest Commission on Colleges and Universities
Education in Polk County, Oregon
Education in Yamhill County, Oregon
1969 establishments in Oregon